SOTC may refer to:

Film
 Secret of the Cave (2006 film), a 2006 student film
 The Haunted House: The Secret of the Cave, a 2018 Korean animated film in The Haunted House by Tooniverse

Literature
 The Secret of the Caves, a 1929 book by Leslie McFarlane

Entertainment
Sale of the Century, television game show
Scars of the Crucifix, album from death metal band Deicide
Shadow of the Colossus, video game
Spirit of the Century, pulp role-playing game
State of the Culture, an American talk show

Government
 State of the City address, a speech given by a mayor or city manager about the condition of the municipality
 Special Operations Training Course, of the United States Marine Forces Special Operations Command

Other uses
 SOTC Travel, formerly "Kouni SOTC" and "SOTC", an Indian tourism company

See also

 
 STC (disambiguation)
 SOC (disambiguation)
 SC (disambiguation)